Thirumuruga Kirupanandha Variyar (1906–1993) was a Shaivite spiritual teacher from India. He was a Murugan devotee who helped rebuild and complete the works on many of the temples across the state. He is known for his discourses on various Shaivite legends.

Coming into prominence at the time when the atheist movement was running hot in the state of Tamil Nadu, he helped to sustain and re-establish Hinduism and Theism in the state. He has also scripted a movie, Siva Kavi. He used all possible mediums to spread Hinduism not restricting himself considering one as inferior and another as superior. In his Detroit discourse on Muruga's kindness, he proposed that women's name should also be added as an initial to the child's name.

He always insisted on discipline being as important to devotion saying one without the other would be fruitless. He is considered to be 64th nayanmar by the people of the state.

Early life 

Variyar, popularly known as Variyar Swamigal, was born in 1906 in a Sengunthar family at Kangeyanallur, a small village on the bank of the Palar river. This province is referred to as Thondai Nadu in Sangam literature.

Isai Perarignar
Variyar Swamigal received the award Isai Perarignar in 1967, given to Tamil musicians every year by the Tamil Isai Sangam of Tamil Nadu in Southern India.

Death 
On 07 Nov 1993, when returning from London to India after his Spiritual lectures, he died on the returning flight of his travel .

References

Indian Hindu spiritual teachers
1906 births
1993 deaths
People from Vellore district
20th-century Hindu religious leaders
Kaumaram